South Main Street Historic District is a national historic district located at Mount Morris in Livingston County, New York. The district encompasses both sides of a three block section of South Main Street (NY-36), one of Mount Morris' premier residential neighborhoods.  The district includes 27 contributing residences along with 13 contributing outbuildings, mostly carriage houses and garages.  They comprise the largest and most impressive collection of predominantly high style domestic architecture in the village in a broad range of architectural styles.

It was listed on the National Register of Historic Places in 1996.

Gallery

References

Historic districts on the National Register of Historic Places in New York (state)
Historic districts in Livingston County, New York
National Register of Historic Places in Livingston County, New York